Kilconly is a small rural village near Tuam which is north of Galway City in County Galway, Ireland. It is situated about seven miles north west of Tuam town on the Ballinrobe road (R332).

Facts
 Feartagar Castle is located 2.3 km (1.4 mi) to the east.
 Birthplace of British prison reformer Mary Size.
 Kilconly GAA is the local Gaelic Athletic Association club.

See also
 List of towns and villages in Ireland

External links
 Kilconly village website

Towns and villages in County Galway
Tuam
Articles on towns and villages in Ireland possibly missing Irish place names